Ciğerci is a Turkish surname. Notable people with the surname include:

 Tolcay Ciğerci (born 1995), German-born Turkish footballer, brother of Tolga
 Tolga Ciğerci (born 1992), Turkish footballer

Turkish-language surnames